Spellow railway station was located on County Road, Walton in Liverpool, England.

History
The station opened in September 1882 on the Canada Dock Branch, which ran from the docks north of Liverpool to Edge Hill.

The station building was at street level, with steps at the back leading down to the platforms which were situated in a deep rock cutting.

The station closed to passengers on 31 May 1948, but the line continued to be used by passenger trains running from Liverpool Lime Street to Southport Chapel Street. This ceased in 1977, but freight trains to and from Seaforth Dock still pass through the station site.

It was proposed that Spellow station would reopen to passengers in 1977 as part of the new Merseyrail network, along with other stations on the branch. Although this never happened it remains a possibility in the future if Merseyrail decides to extend their current network. It was announced in December 2019 that Liverpool City Council had commissioned a feasibility study to see about reopening the Canada Dock Branch to passenger traffic.

The station building still stands and is currently in use by a bookmaker.

References

Sources

External links
 The station's history Disused Stations
 The station and local lines on multiple maps Rail Maps Online
 The station on an Edwardian 25" OS map National Library of Scotland
 The branch with stations and mileages Railway Codes

Former London and North Western Railway stations
Railway stations in Great Britain opened in 1882
Railway stations in Great Britain closed in 1948
Disused railway stations in Liverpool